Mario Javier Sabán (Buenos Aires, 1966), is an Argentinian theologian of Sephardi origin.

Early life
Mario Javier Sabán was born on 12 February 1966. He has a B.L. by University of Buenos Aires.

Career
Sabán began his historical investigations about the Jewish origins of the Argentina's traditional families in 1987. His first work, Converted Jews (1990), became a best-seller. In 2002, he migrated to Spain, where he published his book The Judaism of Saint Paul (2003).

In June 2007 he founded the organization Tarbut Sefarad, over which he presides. In March 2008 he obtained a doctorate in Philosophy from the Complutense University of Madrid. In June of the same year he published his doctoral thesis entitled Rambam, the genius of Moses Maimonides, based on his deep study of the Guide for the Perplexed. In September 2008 he published his eleventh work, The Judaism of Jesus, which is an extensive work dedicated to the teachings of Jesus and their natural relation with Judaism.
None of Saban's books have been translated into English. Although one is advertised for sale with the title ″The Jewish Roots of Christianity,″ it is actually in Spanish.

Published works 
Judíos conversos (1990).
Los hebreos nuestros hermanos mayores or Judíos conversos II (1991).
Los marranos y la economía en el Rio de la Plata or Judíos conversos III (1992).
Mil preguntas y respuestas sobre el judaísmo español y portugués (1993).
Las raíces judías del cristianismo (1994).
El judaísmo de San Pablo (La matriz judía del cristianismo I, 2003).
El sábado hebreo en el cristianismo (La matriz judía del cristianismo II, 2004).
La matriz intelectual del judaísmo y la génesis de Europa (2005).
La cronología del pensamiento judío (2007).
Rambam, el genio de Maimónides (Doctoral thesis, 2008).
El judaísmo de Jesús (2008).
La cábala. La psicología del misticismo judío (Doctoral thesis, 2016).

See also 
The Guide for the Perplexed
Jesus
Saint Paul

External links 
Mario Sabán's official page
Tarbut Sefarad home page
Amazon.com

References 
Sabán, Mario Javier: El judaísmo de Jesús, Saban Editorial, Buenos Aires, 2008.

Argentine male writers
Living people
1966 births
Argentine Sephardi Jews
Spanish Jews
Argentine theologians